The Expanding Circle: Ethics and Sociobiology is a 1981 book by Peter Singer bridging the topics of sociobiology and ethics.

Arguments 

The central tenet of the book is that over the course of human history, people have expanded the circle of beings whose interests they are willing to value similarly to their own. Originally that circle would have been self, family and tribe, but over time it grew to encompass all other humans. In the book, Singer argues that the circle should be expanded to include most animals: 

The Expanding Circle'''s longest chapter concerns the relationship between reason and ethics. Singer discusses the relationship between biological capacity for altruism and morality. He argues that altruism, when directed to one's small circle of family, tribe or even nation, is not moral, but it becomes so when applied to wider circles. This happens because of human capacity for reason, which "generalizes or universalizes" our altruistic tendencies beyond groups we are biologically inclined to be altruistic to. As such, reason is not the opposite of emotions and instincts but instead builds on it. Hence the book title, the "expanding circle", with the circle being our consideration of whom we can be altruistic to, and the reason for its expansion, reason – a product of both ethics and sociology.

 Reception 
One reviewer noted that the book is "a remarkable and worthwhile synthesis of the neo-Kantian ethics of the Harvard moral philosopher John Rawls and the sociobiology of Harvard's E. O. Wilson". Singer's book was indeed seen as one of the responses to Wilson’s 1975 work, Sociobiology: The New Synthesis, which argued that understanding ethics can be reduced to understanding our sociobiological programming. While Wilson's work was at first ignored by moral philosophers, generally seen as controversial and even described as "arrogant", Singer was one of the first moral philosophers to constructively engage with it, arguing that at least some of sociobiology's arguments in general and Wilson's arguments in particular are valuable for further development of our understanding of the field of ethics (also known as moral philosophy).

 Editions 
A new edition, published in 2011, includes a new afterword by Singer. In it, the author discusses how recent progress in biology and genetics have influenced his thinking, and how it reinforces his original theory.

 See also 
 Evolutional Ethics and Animal Psychology The Universal Kinship''

References

Further reading 

1981 non-fiction books
Books about sociobiology
Books by Peter Singer
English-language books
Clarendon Press books
Ethics books
Farrar, Straus and Giroux books